OMJ may refer to:
 Old Man Jenkins, a character from SpongeBob SquarePants
 Oman Medical Journal
 One Million Jobs Report, a report by British businessman Tony Michell
 "Oh Michael Jordan", a phrase from My Wife and Kids